General elections were held in Northern Cyprus on 28 June 1981. Rauf Denktaş was re-elected President, whilst his National Unity Party remained the largest party in the National Council, although it lost its majority.

Results

President
Denktaş was also supported by the Turkish Union Party, the Social Justice Party and the National Goal Party.

National Council

References

Northern Cyprus
1981 in Northern Cyprus
Presidential elections in Northern Cyprus
Elections in Northern Cyprus
June 1981 events in Europe